The bearded wood partridge (Dendrortyx barbatus) is a bird species in the family Odontophoridae, the New World quail. It inhabits the Sierra Madre Oriental of Mexico.

Taxonomy and systematics

The bearded wood partridge shares the genus Dendrortyx with two other species, all of which appear to be quite distinct from each other. It is monotypic.

Description

Adults have bluish gray cheeks, neck, and upper chest. There is a red patch around the eye. The crown is buff and has a small crest. The nape and chest are cinnamon, with red striations on the nape and sides of the chest. The back is a mix of buff, browns, and grays. Immatures are similar to the adults but their chest is duller and the flanks have brown bars.

Distribution and habitat

The bearded wood partridge has a discontinuous range in the central part of Mexico's Sierra Madre Oriental. The Santo Domingo River in northern Oaxaca and western slope of the Sierra Madre Oriental act as biogeographic barriers. It inhabits the interiors and edges of humid evergreen montane forest and pine-oak forest, both primary and secondary. It is also found in gardens and sometimes in farmland. It is often restricted to narrow riparian zones.

Behavior

Feeding

The bearded wood partridge forages on the ground. Its diet includes seeds, fruits, buds, tubers, and insects.

Breeding

Little is known about the bearded wood partridge's breeding phenology. Is is reported to breed between April and June. The male makes a dome-shaped nest with a tunnel entrance. The clutch size is usually five.

Vocalization

The bearded wood-partridge's song is "a series of loud, rollicking whistles, repeated rapidly and often given in duet". The sexes' songs are similar but the female's is quieter. The song is mostly given at dawn and dusk. Groups sing to maintain contact.

Status

The IUCN has assessed the bearded wood partridge as Vulnerable since 2000 after initially rating it Critically Endangered. "[S]urveys have found this species to be more widespread and numerous than previously thought, however it still has a highly fragmented range and small population undergoing a continuous decline."

References

External links
BirdLife Species Factsheet.

bearded wood partridge
Endemic birds of Eastern Mexico
bearded wood partridge
Taxonomy articles created by Polbot
Birds of the Sierra Madre Oriental
Fauna of the Sierra Madre de Oaxaca